Mohammed Jamal Jebreen, simply known as Mohammed Jamal, is a professional footballer who plays as a winger for Hapoel Iksal. Born in Israel, he represented the Palestine national team.

International career 
He received his first call up to the Palestine national football team in 2010 against Sudan. He has since played for Palestine at the 2010 WAFF Championship, the qualifying rounds of 2012 AFC Challenge Cup, and the 2012 AFC Challenge Cup finals. He scored his first goal for the national team on his debut against Sudan.

Career statistics

International

References

1982 births
Living people
Arab citizens of Israel
Palestinian footballers
Hapoel Umm al-Fahm F.C. players
Hapoel Asi Gilboa F.C. players
Hapoel Herzliya F.C. players
Hapoel Petah Tikva F.C. players
Hilal Al-Quds Club players
Shabab Al-Khalil SC players
Ihud Bnei Kafr Qara F.C. players
Markaz Balata players
Thaqafi Tulkarem players
Ahva Arraba F.C. players
Maccabi Umm al-Fahm F.C. players
Hapoel Ironi Baqa al-Gharbiyye F.C. players
Hapoel Iksal F.C. players
Liga Leumit players
West Bank Premier League players
Palestine international footballers
Footballers from Umm al-Fahm
Footballers at the 2010 Asian Games
Association football wingers
Asian Games competitors for Palestine
Israeli people of Saudi Arabian descent